John Hotop (7 December 1929 – 30 August 2015) was a New Zealand rugby union player. He was a member of the New Zealand national side, the All Blacks, in 1952 and 1955. Three internationals against Australia were the full extent of his involvement with the All Blacks.

References

1929 births
2015 deaths
Bush rugby union players
Canterbury rugby union players
Lincoln University (New Zealand) alumni
Manawatu rugby union players
Massey University alumni
New Zealand international rugby union players
New Zealand rugby union players
Otago rugby union players
People educated at Waitaki Boys' High School
Rugby union fly-halves
Rugby union players from Alexandra, New Zealand